Mark Ramsey Wharton is a British musician who has worked as the drummer of Acid Reign, Cathedral, Cronos, Asomvel and Workshed.

Biography
Wharton formed Acid Reign in 1985, along with Kevin "Kev" Papworth, Ian Gangwer, Howard "H" Smith and Gaz Jennings, whom he had met at Granby High School in Harrogate Acid Reign eventually broke up in 1991 after the release of their 1990 album "Obnoxious", leading to Wharton joining his ex-Acid Reign bandmates Gaz Jennings and Adam Lehan in Cathedral in 1992. Wharton then proceeded to form the band Asomvel with Jay-Jay Winter (whom he had played with in an early band, called "Lochenbar") and Lenny Robinson in 1993. At this time, Wharton would also join Venom vocalist Conrad Lant's eponymous band Cronos, however, by 1996 Wharton was no longer present in any of these projects.

Discography

With Acid Reign
Studio albums
The Fear (1989)
Obnoxious (1990)

EPs
Moshkinstein (1988)

With Cathedral
Studio albums
The Ethereal Mirror (1993)

EPs
Soul Sacrifice (1992)
Statik Majik (1994)
Cosmic Requiem (1994)

With Cronos
Venom (1995)

With Workshed
Workshed (2019)

References

Living people
English heavy metal drummers
Thrash metal musicians
People from Harrogate
Cathedral (band) members
Acid Reign members
Year of birth missing (living people)